Liebfrauenkirche (Church of Our Dear Lady) is a common dedication for churches in German-speaking countries.

Liebfrauenkirche may refer to:
Church of Our Lady (Bremen)
Liebfrauen, Frankfurt, a Gothic church in the centre of Frankfurt am Main
Liebfrauenkirche, Goslar, a former chapel of the Imperial Palace of Goslar, Germany
Liebfrauenkirche, Halle
Liebfrauenkirche, Mainz, a portion of Mainz Cathedral, Germany, that was demolished in 1803
Liebfrauenkirche, Trier, an early Gothic cathedral in Trier, Germany
Liebfrauenkirche, Worms, a church on the outskirts of Worms, Germany, whose surrounding vineyards originated the Liebfraumilch style of wine
Überwasserkirche, Münster, North Rhine-Westphalia, Germany

See also
Frauenkirche (disambiguation)
Freiburg Minster, or Münster Unserer Lieben Frau
St. Mary's Church (disambiguation)
Church of Our Lady (disambiguation)
Onze-Lieve-Vrouwekerk (disambiguation)